National Secondary Route 256, or just Route 256 (or ) is a National Road Route of Costa Rica, located in the Limón province.

Description
In Limón province the route covers Talamanca canton (Cahuita district).

References

Highways in Costa Rica